Summer Rain may refer to:

Rainfall during the summertime season

Film and theatre
 Summer Rain (1937 film), an Italian film directed by Mario Monicelli
 A Summer Rain, a 1978 Brazilian film directed by Carlos Diegues
 Summer Rain (2006 film), directed by Antonio Banderas
 Summer Rain (musical), a 1983 Australian stage musical

Songs
 "Summer Rain" (Belinda Carlisle song), 1990; covered by Slinkee Minx, 2004
 "Summer Rain" (GFriend song), 2017
 "Summer Rain" (Johnny Rivers song), 1967
 "Summer Rain" (Matthew Morrison song), 2011
 "Summer Rain", by Alphaville from The Breathtaking Blue, 1989
 "Summer Rain", by ATB from The DJ 3 in the Mix, 2006
 "Summer Rain", by Sia from This Is Acting, 2016
 "Summer Rain", by U2 from All That You Can't Leave Behind, 2000
 "Summer Rain", by Whitesnake from Good to Be Bad

See also
 Summer Rains (disambiguation)